Union Lake is an all-sports, 465-acre lake in Oakland County, Michigan, United States.  The lake lies within Commerce Township.  It is the tenth-largest lake and third-deepest lake in Oakland County.

Union Lake is considered one of the leading walleye fishing lakes in the state.

The lake has one public boat-launch.

References

Lakes of Oakland County, Michigan
Lakes of Michigan